Adéwọlé is a surname or first name of Yoruba origin, meaning "the crown or royalty has entered the (family) house". Notable people with the name include:

 Isaac Folorunso Adewole (born 1954), Nigerian professor of gynaecology and obstetrics
 Tobi Adewole (born 1995), is an American soccer player
 Kayode Sakariyah Adewole (born 1982), is a lecturer at University of Ilorin, Nigeria. His Google Scholar profile is available here.
 Adewole (Wole) Akosile Australian Addiction medicine specialist and Novelist. His website is available here

See also 
 Adewale

References 

Yoruba-language surnames